The 1969 British Grand Prix was a Formula One motor race held at the Silverstone Circuit on 19 July 1969. It was race 6 of 11 in both the 1969 World Championship of Drivers and the 1969 International Cup for Formula One Manufacturers. Jackie Stewart was victorious, as he lapped the entire field and took his fifth win in six races.

The race developed as a contest between Stewart and Jochen Rindt who constantly overtook each other by slipstreaming. It was on one of these occasions towards the end when Stewart signalled to Rindt as he drew alongside that the end plate of his rear wing had come loose and was fouling the left-rear tyre each time Rindt flung his Lotus through a fast right-hander. Rindt was able to confirm this in his mirror and was forced to pit. However, his team failed to put enough fuel into the car to enable him to finish the race and consequently he was obliged to make a further stop. The race was also notable for being the only race that Cosworth entered. Their car was withdrawn weeks before the race weekend.

Classification

Qualifying

Race

Championship standings after the race

Drivers' Championship standings

Constructors' Championship standings

Note: Only the top five positions are included for both sets of standings. Only the best 5 results from the first 6 rounds and the best 4 results from the last 5 rounds counted towards the Championship. Numbers without parentheses are Championship points; numbers in parentheses are total points scored.

References

Further reading

British Grand Prix
British Grand Prix
Grand Prix
British Grand Prix